James Clifford Brown (1923–2004) was an English composer, former Senior Lecturer in the Department of Music and Organist at the University of Leeds.

Life
James Clifford Brown, usually referred to as James Brown, was born at 49 St. Matthew's Street, Ipswich on 18 August 1923. His father Henry John Brown was an electrical engineer and later professional cellist while his mother Lois was a junior school teacher. James also had a brother named Tom being a chartered engineer and a sister called Dulcie who has been a civil servant, a missionary and a music teacher of cello and classical guitar.

He was trained in singing and organ-playing by Jonathan Job, the Ipswich Borough Organist, then himself became organist and choirmaster at All Hallows' Church.

In 1941 he left Northgate School and won a choral studentship to St John's College, Cambridge, but his studies were interrupted by war service. He resumed study after his return in 1945, and was then appointed as organ student.

From 1948 until retirement in 1983 he was a lecturer, then senior lecturer, in the music department of the University of Leeds. He was active as a composer throughout this time.
In 1951 he was asked by his friend Allan Wicks to write the music for the first major revival of the York Mystery Plays, which were a triumphant success.
In 1961–1962 he took a year's leave to study with Boris Porena in Rome.

He made his home in Kirkstall until 2003. Subsequently he moved to Bridlington, where he died on 21 December 2004.

Published works in print
See 
The Lark now leaves his wat'ry Nest, for 2-part female voices and piano, 1949
Portsmouth, solo song with piano, 1949
A Nocturne, solo song with piano, 1950
Andante Sospirando, organ, 1951
Sonatina, clarinet and viola, 1952
The Lass for a Sailor, solo song with piano, 1955
Careless Content, solo song with piano, 1957
A Morning Pastoral, three songs for SSA, 1965
Promenade, piano duet, 1974
Silent Spring, solo song with piano, 1976
If ye turn to him, motet for unison boys' voices and organ, 1980
Serenade, clarinet in A and piano, 1950, revised 1985
Prelude and Postlude for Easter, organ, 1987
The Shepherds' Nativity Hymn, for SATB choir and wind orchestra, 1991
From East to West, for SATB choir and keyboard, 1991
Summer Idyll, organ, 2000

References

English composers
Alumni of St John's College, Cambridge
1923 births
2004 deaths